The Calgary and Edmonton Railway (C&E) was an early pioneer railway in what was then the Northwest Territories, now Alberta, Canada.  It connected the towns of Calgary and Strathcona (also called South Edmonton).  Construction started in April 1890 and it opened August 1891. The line was the first major transportation connection for the isolated Edmonton settlement, and the development of the line was responsible for the creation of many railway towns along the line such as Red Deer and Wetaskiwin. It supplanted the Calgary and Edmonton Trail as the busiest transportation route along the Calgary–Edmonton Corridor.

Initially, the northern terminus of the line was the old wooden Strathcona train station, a replica of which the Calgary and Edmonton Railway Station Museum operates, until the Edmonton, Yukon and Pacific Railway company was created to run a shortline across the North Saskatchewan River in 1902.  In 1907 the new Strathcona Canadian Pacific Railway station became the depot for Strathcona. From 1998 to 2010 the former station housed the Iron Horse Night Club. 

The line's primary raison d'être was to move in settlers from the east coast to Edmonton where they would congregate at immigration halls and land titles offices before setting out into the rural areas to start homesteads.  Some limited export of grain happened from farms near the line, but the real grain boom in the area required the construction of many more branch lines lined with grain elevators.

The line was later acquired by the Canadian Pacific Railway, and Strathcona merged with Edmonton in 1912.  The line itself still exists, and although train passenger service was discontinued in 1985, the Edmonton Radial Railway Society operates vintage street cars from Old Strathcona across the High Level Bridge to stops south of Jasper Avenue and near the Legislature.

References

See also
Calgary and Edmonton Trail

Canadian Pacific Railway subsidiaries
Defunct Alberta railways
1891 in Alberta
Railway lines opened in 1891 
History of Edmonton
History of Calgary
Red Deer, Alberta
District of Alberta